There are 64 football stadiums in Italy which have a capacity of 10,000 or more. They are listed by total capacity. Below the list is a list with smaller venues and a list with future venues.

Existing stadiums

Stadiums with a capacity below 10,000

A capacity of at least 5,000 is required.

Future stadiums
Stadiums which are currently in development, and are likely to open in the near future, include:

See also
List of European stadiums by capacity
List of association football stadiums by capacity
A Guide to all 64 Italian Football Stadiums - Details and facts

References

 
Italy
Football stadiums in Italy